Aaron (Albert) Alexandre (around 1765/68 in Hohenfeld, Franconia – 16 November 1850 in London, England) was a German–French–English chess player and writer.

Aaron Alexandre, a Bavarian trained as a rabbi, arrived in France in 1793. Encouraged by the French Republic's policy of religious toleration, he became a French citizen. At first, he worked as a German teacher and as mechanical inventor. Eventually, chess became his primary occupation. He tried to make a complete survey of the chess openings, publishing his findings as the Encyclopédie des échecs (Encyclopedia of Chess, Paris, 1837). In this book, he used the algebraic notation and the castling symbols 0–0 and 0–0–0. In 1838, he won a match against Howard Staunton in London, though before Staunton became a master. Alexandre was one of operators of the fake chess-playing machine known as the Turk.

See also
 List of Jewish chess players

References

1766 births
1850 deaths
People from Kitzingen
18th-century German Jews
Jewish chess players
German chess players
French chess players
British chess players
German chess writers
French chess writers
British chess writers
18th-century French Jews
German emigrants to the United Kingdom
German emigrants to France
German male non-fiction writers
French male non-fiction writers